Joyrider were a rock band from Portadown, Northern Ireland. The band consisted of Phil Woolsey (guitar, vocals), Cliff Mitchell (guitar), Simon Haddock (bass) and Keith Irwin, Buc Hamill / Carl Alty (drums). Joyrider initially signed to Andy Cairns' Blunt record label, but after releasing their first two EPs signed a recording contract with Paradox Records.

The band's biggest hit was a cover of the Jane Wiedlin song, "Rush Hour". They supported Terrorvision on their May 1995 United Kingdom tour.

Woolsey later played in the bands Ninebar International and Roque Junior. and now fronts Papa Luna

Haddock is now a member of Trucker Diablo, who played the Download Festival in June 2011, toured with Black Stone Cherry and were booked for Hammerfest
in March 2012 on the same bill as Anthrax, Skindred and Evile.

Discography

EPs
 "Dweeb King" (1994)
 "Getting That Joke Now" (1994)
 "Seven Sisters" (1995)
 "It Moved" (1995)

Singles
 "Self Infliction" (1995)
 "Fabulae" (1995)
 "Vegetable Animal Mineral" (1996)
 "Another Skunk Song" (1996)
 "Rush Hour" (July 1996, UK No. 22)
 "All Gone Away" (Single, September 1996, UK No. 54)

Studio album
 Be Special (1996)

References

Rock music groups from Northern Ireland